The K1 is a South Korean main battle tank designed by Chrysler Defense (later General Dynamics Land Systems) and Hyundai Precision Industry (later Hyundai Rotem) for the Republic of Korea Armed Forces. The vehicle's design was based on Chrysler's M1 Abrams together with some proven subsystems from M60A3. The K1A1 is an up-gunned variant with a 120 mm 44 caliber smoothbore gun, and outfitted with more modern electronics, ballistic computers, fire control systems, and armor. Hyundai Rotem produced 1,511 K1 and K1A1 tanks between 1986 and 2010.

Development

In the early 1970s, South Korea received an intelligence report about North Korea locally producing Soviet T-62 tanks. Meanwhile, the U.S. 7th Infantry Division began withdrawing from South Korea from 1969 to 1971 under the Nixon Doctrine. South Korean President Park Chung-hee requested the latest variant of M60 tanks to maintain the balance of power. However, the United States responded by transferring used M48 tanks and providing upgrades instead; South Korea received 25 M48A5s from the United States Forces Korea and numerous M48A3s that were used, but in good condition, during the Vietnam War.

Under the agreement, South Korea received the technical data package (TDP) of the M48 Patton and its upgrade kits for 12 major enhancements. Korean engineers were sent to the United States Army Depot in Alabama for training, such as armor cast steel welding and production, precision manufacturing, assembling skills, quality inspection, and test evaluation. Around the same time, Park Chung-hee ordered the development of a domestic tank and personally summoned Chung Ju-yung, the founder of Hyundai Group, to recommend building a tank factory. Chung Ju-yung, thinking that the president asked for a train factory, promised to build one. The chairman was shocked after learning about his misunderstanding from the secretary as he was leaving the building.

Not satisfied with the M48 Patton upgrade, South Korea began looking for a new tank that could overwhelm every North Korean counterpart as the existence of the T-62 and its manufacturing facility were confirmed by satellite images in 1976. South Korea first asked Chrysler Defense for a solution to acquire a better tank, and Chrysler suggested purchasing the M60A3 or producing it in South Korea. Because the American offer was an outdated design, South Korea then contacted KraussMaffei of West Germany to receive technical assistance, and KraussMaffei offered a unique tank design based on Leopard 1. Both South Korea and West Germany kept the cooperation in secret because the two nations believed that the United States would intervene once the information had been leaked. In 1977, as expected, Chrysler Defense showed interest in the Korean tank project after its engineers became available and wanted to generate more profit after the development of the M1 Abrams. This time, Chrysler offered a new tank based on the newest M1 Abrams. Eventually, the American design was chosen, and a memorandum of understanding (MOU) was signed on 6 July 1978 to supply two prototypes, and the executive contract was signed on 1 December 1978.

Between 1979 and 1980, several MOUs were signed between the two nations, mostly regarding intellectual rights and royalty payments. According to the MOU, the United States will provide its state-of-art Special Armor Plate (SAP), in which the material and protection are identical to the M1 Abrams while limiting Koreans from access until the installation due to national security reasons. Exporting of K1 is strictly controlled and needs authorization from the United States as many sensitive systems are installed, and South Korea requires to pay a royalty to Chrysler Defense. Also, 44 designated parts (gradually reduced to 14) cannot be changed without United States approval, and some parts must be purchased periodically. In addition, South Korea will have the rights on, and be limited to, the technologies developed uniquely with the money provided by South Korea, while Chrysler also claims the rights to use them in the future. On the other hand, South Korea benefitted from the development cost of the cooperation with Chrysler; South Korea paid $60 million for the prototype development, far below the $700 million spent on M1 Abrams. However, Hyundai Precision Industry, which planned to produce the tank at its new factory, was excluded from direct involvement in designing the tank, and it was the biggest problem since Koreans had never made tanks before. Under these conditions, Koreans will be unable to produce tanks as they do not understand the structure and technology of the tank even with prototypes in hand.

From October 1980 to April 1981, Chrysler had three meetings with Hyundai to confirm the required operational capability (ROC) and presented a small-scale mock-up and reports. During the production of the prototypes, Chrysler Defense was sold to General Dynamics Land Systems (GDLS) in March 1982. A total of 2 prototypes named ROKIT (Republic of Korea Indigenous Tank) were produced with designations PV-1 (MTR - mobility test rig) and PV-2 (FTR - firepower test rig) in 1983 after 3 years of development and went to trial at Aberdeen Proving Ground based on American military standards. During the trial, PV-1 failed to climb the longitudinal slope of 60%, experienced a fire on the 1,200 hp Teledyne Continental Motors AVCR-1790 engine, and had issues with its transmission. PV-2 also reported issues with its fire control system; LOS (line of sight) was shaking due to frost in the winter season, taking too long for warmup, interference from electromagnetic waves, and lockup of the ballistic computer. Protection tests were done on separately built ballistic hulls and turrets, which showed some flaws during the test. Eventually, the known problems were fixed and improved by the time of delivery of the two prototypes. In the end, GDLS transferred the PV-1 along with 1,370 pages of blueprints and the TDP, but the number of blueprints was insufficient for manufacturing.

During the trial, a team of Korean engineers from Hyundai Precision Industry was dispatched to join Chrysler's developer team to look over the progress. Although the contract limits technological access to Koreans, engineers from both nations freely shared information during friendship interactions, including a classified specification of M1 Abrams. When the upper management of Chrysler found out about this, they built a wall in the office to prevent information leakage. However, Koreans managed to obtain significant data during their three year-presence at the facility. In addition, the manufacturing team of Hyundai came for a tour of the American tank factory to understand how to build a tank factory. Koreans could only go to the specified path, but they memorized types of machinery and calculated the required sizes of the facility by counting the footsteps, which helped them to build the new factory at Changwon.

In 1983, Hyundai accepted GDLS' new offer and acquired special welding of armor plates, assembly of major devices, and weapon testing technologies. 30 engineers from GDLS were also sent to Korea and participated in producing and testing preproduction models. From September 1984 to August 1985, a total of 5 XK1s were completed (2 for the Agency for Defense Development, 2 for the ROK Army, and 1 for the Army logistics), and went for further testing in South Korea. However, Hyundai realized that GDLS had made a crucial mistake by providing outdated blueprints that did not reflect the latest fixes, and XK1s began to experience the same issues they saw from early prototypes. In addition, the lack of detailed blueprints forced Korean engineers to rework the tank and create 5 thousand design changes and 10 thousand pages of blueprints. The biggest change during this process was the switching of the mobility system from American to German, in which the design change was done by GDLS. The air-cooled AVCR-1790 had lower torque, thus unable to drive at high incline angles, and experienced fire several times, contributing to unexpected fire tests that proved the tank's survivability. For this reason, the MTU Friedrichshafen MB871Ka-501 water-cooled engine and the ZF Friedrichshafen LSG 3000 transmission were chosen for the new power pack. These preproduction variants entered service with the South Korean military in February 1986.

On the other hand, Hughes' GPSS (Gunner's Primary Sight System) continuously saw issues with low accuracy and operational uses, while Hughes forced South Koreans to give up localization of the GPSS by doubling up the price when licensing. GDLS, which acquired Hughes in 1985, revealed that the system uses parts from Canada, West Germany, and Switzerland, and thus requires time-consuming multi-national cooperation to solve to problem. In 1986, another contract was signed between Hyundai and GDLS for updating the GPSS, increasing the cost of the gunner's sight. This unsatisfactory led South Koreans to look for alternative options immediately. In April 1987, the K1 tank test evaluation for conditional mass production was completed, and serial production began in September 1987. On 18 September, the tank was given the nickname 88-Tank by South Korean president Chun Doo-hwan to celebrate the upcoming 1988 Summer Olympics.

1,027 K1s were produced between 1986 and 1997 in 3 batches with design changes in each batch. In 1995, the K1s received their first depot maintenance at Hyundai Precision Industry in the order of production (10-year cycle). The work includes the application of 3rd batch updates on the earlier produced vehicles.

General characteristics
The K1 retains most of the features of the M1 Abrams but also shows differences. Its main armament is a licensed M68A1 105 mm 52 caliber tank gun under designation KM68A1 by Hyundai Precision Industry carrying 47 rounds of ammunition at the hull and turret as it lacks bustle storage in the rear of the turret, which is filled with radio systems. The main gun is assisted by a 16-bit fire control system and digital ballistic calculator. The tank has either M2 Browning or SNT Dynamics K6 12.7x99 mm NATO on the commander's hatch mount, an M60D 7.62×51mm NATO machine gun on the loader's hatch mount, and an M60E2-1 7.62×51mm NATO coaxial machine gun for gunner as secondary armaments.

The K1 has a size of 9.67 m (length with gun forward) x 3.60 m (width) x 2.25 m (height) and weighs 51.1 t or 51.5 t. It is powered by a German power pack consisting of 1,200 hp (23.5 hp/t) from MTU Friedrichshafen MB871Ka-501 8-cylinder water-cooled turbocharged diesel engine licensed by Ssangyong Heavy Industries (now STX Engine) and ZF Friedrichshafen LSG 3000 transmission licensed by Hyundai Precision Industry (now Hyundai Transys). The tank can drive at a maximum speed of 65 km on paved roads and 40 km on cross-country with a 500 km cruising range. Its chassis uses hybrid suspension combining hydropneumatic suspension on wheels 1, 2, and 6 and torsion bars on wheels 3, 4, and 5. It allows the tank to use kneeling to supplement the depression of the main gun, which is limited by the small-sized turret to minus 10 degrees, and provides crew comfortability on rough terrains. For comparison, M1 Abrams is 9.77 m x 3.66 m x 2.37 m and weighs 54 t.

The Gun/Turret Drive and Stabilization System (GTDSS) measures and compensates yawing and pitching, which occur on uneven and curved roads for gun turret to be capable of the precise fire while running. The GTDSS consists elevation servo system, elevation drive system, reference gyro, traverse servo system, traverse drive system, feed-forward gyro, electronic unit for gun and turret drive, and steering handle for artillery man. The system is locally produced in South Korea by Dongmyeong Heavy Industries (now Mottrol) since 1992.

The gunner's sight was initially a problematic Hughes GPSS, which uses an Nd:YAG laser rangefinder, a similar model used for the M1 Abrams. Despite Koreans having decided to upgrade the existing GPSS, Samsung Electronics signed a deal with Texas Instruments to supply and locally produce the GPTTS (Gunner's Primary Tank Thermal Sight) in 1986. Hyundai originally planned to install GPTTS in 1987, but serious problems such as the failure of the laser rangefinder forced Hyundai to postpone the plan. Due to the delays, a total of 445 K1s were manufactured with imported Hughes GPSS until 1991. Meantime, after failing to repair the GPTTS, Texas Instruments gave access to technology to the Agency for Defense Development. Within a year, a combined team managed to fix the sight and further improve it by increasing the sight's distance from 2 km to 3 km. Samsung Electronics began supplying the GPTTS in 1991. Later, during the parliamentary investigation, it was found that there were lobbies involved in selecting the GPTTS, leading to a selection of the product without proper testing, which caused an additional development cost of 16 billion KRW on the sight. Regardless of the involvement of lobbies, upgraded GPTTS showed superior performance when shooting the hidden target behind the smoke screen, which the GPSS failed to do so during the test on 2 September 1993. The GPTTS uses a carbon dioxide laser range finder, which is safer for the human eye upon being hit by the laser, while Nd:YAG can blind the victim. However, the GPTTS was a complex and heavier system. Ironically, access to GPTTS technology enabled Koreans to design their own gunner's sight. The ADD began the research in 1992 for domestic gunner's sight (later known as KGPS: Korean Gunner's Primary Sight) using the Raman laser believing such technology would be used for future weapon systems. In 1995, by the time Koreans were at the end stage of development, Europe announced it would use Raman lasers for tanks followed by the United States.

The commander's sight is from SFIM (now SAGEM) of France, and it has a hunter-killer ability that allows tank crews to engage multiple targets at once by allowing the commander to search 360 degrees and direct the main gun. The hunter-killer feature was a major difference compared to the M1 Abrams, which becomes available on later M1A2 upgrades. The commander's sight was not, however, equipped with light amplification or thermal optics, which led to the commander to rely on personal night vision goggles for night operation, while the gunner's sight was equipped with a thermal observation device, which meant that the K1 had superior sensors until the introduction of the M1A2.

The Special Armor Plate (SAP) is a classified composite armor used for the K1 tanks crafted by the United States using identical materials and technologies used on the armor of M1 Abrams. Its specifications are strictly restricted for public release and limit South Koreans from accessing the armor. The SAP is applied on the turret and the front of the hull. Meanwhile, the side of the hull is protected with additional RHA plates, which provide protection to all types of 115 mm ammunition fired from T-62 in the hands of North Korea at the time of the development. According to the media report, the frontal armor of the K1 baseline is between 400 and 500 mm against KE projectiles. Smoke grenade launchers are located on each outer side of the turret front. The vehicle is also equipped with a fire-extinguishing system in the engine room, where the system notifies crews to activate automatic extinguishers when a thermometer detects a critical temperature. The extinguishant used is Halon1301, commonly used by western main battle tanks. The vehicle lacks an overpressure system for CBRN defense, and thus requires tank crews to wear personal protective gear to operate in  chemical, biological, radiological, and nuclear warfare environments.

Operational history
On 19 June 1995, the United States and South Korea agreed exporting the K1 to third countries during the defense talks. Hyundai Precision Industry planned to sell 70 tanks to Malaysia. The price of the K1 was increased to $2.8 billion KRW in 1995. The K1 was displayed in Malaysia at DSA 1996 on 23–26 April 1996. To suit the jungle environment of Malaysia, Hyundai suggested a 47.9 t variant K1M based on the K1; the tank carries a total of 41 rounds and is equipped with KGPS for the gunner's sight and an overpressure device for CBRN protection. The K1 competed against Polish PT-91 Twardy of Bumar-Labedy and Ukrainian T-84 of KMDB. Initially, the K1 was favored by Malaysia, but the high price and Malaysia's economic crisis caused by the 1997 Asian financial crisis led to the selection of Polish PT-91.

On 7 June 1999, Hyundai Precision Industry announced to co-develop the K1 tank simulator for weaponry with the ADD to lower the training cost. On 19 February 2001, Hyundai Mobis (formerly Hyundai Precision Industry) announced that the simulator was completed and supplied to the military on 19 February 2001. Simulators are expected to decrease training costs from 20 billion KRW to 1.4 billion KRW per 1,000 trainees every year.

On 28 October 1999, Samsung Electronics and Thomson-CSF agreed to create a joint venture with each company investing and holding 50% of the shares. Thomson-CSF will receive technology transfer of Samsung's defense products such as communication equipment, satellite communication systems, and terminals, fire control systems, detection and tracking devices, radar guidance equipment, and gunner's sight (KGPS), while Samsung will gain access to Thomson-CSF's network for overseas exports. In February 2000, Samsung Thomson-CSF was created, and it was renamed Samsung Thales on 26 February 2001.

On 27 February 2003, Ssang Yong Information and the ADD developed an IETM (interactive electronic technical manual) in four CD-ROMs that contain twenty books of a technical manual for the K1A1 using domestically developed software for the first time. On 26 September, the ADD announced the development of insensitive gunpower that does not explode in shock, fire, or heat that can occur in the transport, storage, and operation of warheads and ammunition.

On 21 October 2004, it was revealed that South Korea was developing depleted uranium tank munitions between 1983 to 1987. South Korea eventually halted the development after the United States learned about the project in 1987.

On 6 August 2010, during a live firing exercise at Paju, a round exploded in the barrel of a K1's 105 mm gun, destroying the gun, but leaving the crew uninjured. This was reported to be the latest in a series of such accidents since the K1 entered service.

In December 2020, the Agency for Defense Development (ADD) commenced a program to develop unmanned versions of the K1 tank and K9 Thunder. Hyundai Rotem was contracted to develop the unmanned tank by 2024.

K1A1

In 1985, South Korea exercised for K1 upgrade plan report, included in the previous contract. GDLS responded with an upgraded model with a 120 mm smoothbore gun similar to M1A1 Abrams. In the late 1980s, South Korea received multiple intelligence reports about North Korea purchasing T-72 tanks, which had a 125 mm smoothbore cannon. The intelligence report turned out to be false decades later. However, it alerted South Korea at that time as a 125 mm smoothbore could fire from a farther distance and have higher penetration compared to a 105 mm rifled cannon. Therefore, South Korean government requested the ADD to make a new tank equipped with a 120 mm cannon. In 1988, the ADD launched exploration development, and began official system development with Hyundai Precision Industry in 1991.

The ADD and Hyundai submitted a plan to redesign the tank by replacing most parts with the latest technology. However, the plan was rejected by the military as such an upgrade would require a budget over the limit, and too luxurious for a conscription army. Therefore, the ADD and Hyundai changed the plan by focusing on the weaponry by increasing the caliber to 120 mm. Since South Korea does not know the specification of 120 mm cannon, it decided to compare the cannons from the United States, Germany, France, and Israel, while ammunition was competed between the United States, which was a German design, and Israel. On 10 March 1994, Poongsan Corporation was selected as the main supplier of the 120 mm tank ammunition. In September 1994, despite the Israeli IMI 120 mm gun showing better performance, easier logistics access made South Korea licence produce the American M256 120 mm smoothbore, which was based on German Rheinmetall Rh-120, as designation KM256. Meanwhile, on October 10, 1996, ADD announced that it would develop domestic 120mm ammunition without receiving technology transfer from foreign countries.

On 7 October 1994, the ADD reported at the parliamentary inspection that the KGPS, fitted with a Raman laser rangefinder, was tested on the K1 and showed good performances. It is expected to be tested on an upgraded prototype in 1996.

The delivery ceremony of the K1A1 prototype was held on 3 April 1996. The major improvement was firepower, which was increased from 300 mm penetration at 1.2 km to 600 mm  penetration at 2 km. South Korea expects to mass-produce K1A1 in 1997. On 9 October, the ADD announced the development of the KGPS, which was developed by the technologies gained during the GPTTS upgrades.

On 9 June 1998, the Ministry of Defense announced that mass production of K1A1 would begin in 1999, 2 years behind schedule due to 1997 Asian financial crisis that decreased the defense budget. On 15 November 1999, Hyundai Precision Industry signed an estimate of 1 trillion KRW contract to produce K1A1. The first K1A1 release ceremony was held on 12 October 2001. The tank weighs 53.2 t and has a length of 9.71 m (gun forward), and each tank costs 4.4 billion KRW.

Unlike the K1, the newly upgraded design was made only by Korean engineers. Originally, GDLS wanted to participate in the K1 series to maintain its level of influence, and it proposed a partnership for the project due to concerns about Koreans lacking such skills. However, South Korean engineers declined the offer, and decided to take full responsibility on the project even if it fails, because they could learn about the main battle tank throughout the process and to maximize localization by reducing the technological reliance from GDLS. In the end, GDLS transferred the TDP, and sent a small team of engineers to South Korea for a 50-man-day contract, but the contract was never needed.

Despite the similar look, the K1A1 is made of completely different materials and carries more advanced subsystems. The K1A1 can easily be distinguished from the K1 by the shape of the gun, location of the co-axial machinegun, shape of the commander's sight, and overall angular shape of the turret (the K1A1 has more curved surfaces than the K1). The 120 mm smoothbore gun of K1A1 is thicker than the K1's 105 mm rifled gun and has a thicker thermal sleeve a third of the way from the base of the gun. The co-axial machinegun on K1A1 is located at a much higher point compared to the K1. The K1A1 also features a somewhat cone-shaped day/night KGPS compared to day-only sight of the K1, which has a plain, tube-like appearance to it.

Firepower 

The most important upgrade was switching the main gun from a 105 mm KM68A1 rifled (47 rounds) to a 120 mm KM256 smoothbore (32 rounds), which is produced under license by Hyundai Precision Industry (now Hyundai WIA), mounted on the domestically upgraded turret. In addition, South Korea began to deploy K276 120 mm armor-piercing fin-stabilized discarding sabot (APFSDS) ammunition with the most sophisticated tungsten heavy alloy penetrators during that time, created after several technological breakthroughs that were new to the world. Benefitted from domestic tungsten processing technologies from abundant deposits, Korean engineers invented a self-sharpening process on the tungsten heavy alloy, which the process was only achievable from depleted uranium (DU) penetrators, by applying microstructure control and multi-stage heat treatment after 4 years of development between in 1990 to 1993 with 1.1 billion KRW budget. Most penetrators in the world receive a single heat treatment, while Korean penetrators are treated 20 times using the new technology, which increases impact toughness by 300%. The self-sharpening effect increases penetration by 8–16% compared to regular penetrators and compensates 6–10% less penetration from material disadvantage against DU, providing firepower of that of DU ammunition in a DU particles-free environment. South Korea holds related patents on 6 other nations, and the technology was on the U.S. Army Master Plan in 1997 and 1998 as a technology to acquire from outside the United States.

Electronics and sensors 
The systems were upgraded from 16-bit to 32-bit and were designed using upgraded computers including 32-bit digital ballistic calculators.

The new gunner's sight KGPS consists of a stabilization device that allows better accuracy for aiming and shooting during maneuvers, a thermal imaging device and a daytime optical device for day and night observation and a laser rangefinder that measures the range of the captured target. The sharpness and magnification of the thermal imager and daytime optical system have been increased, making it possible to observe and identify the target from a greater distance. In particular, the screen display method of the thermal imager has been improved for enhanced night combat capability. The laser rangefinder uses an eye-safe Raman laser, which gives excellent distance measurement ability while providing crew safety during crew training. In addition, the sight has a recording feature for the gunner to check the location of the aiming point during actual shooting or non-shooting training, enhancing the training effect and verifying the results. The thermal imaging device can be operated independently for convenience, thus allowing the tank to shoot even if the thermal malfunctions.  The daytime optical system image is displayed in natural color, making it convenient to observe. The power consumption is reduced by about 40% compared to the previous model, which increases operational time with the engine off to maximize stealth kill. It has a daytime magnification of 1 to 10 times and a far-infrared thermal magnification of 3 to 10 times.

The new commander's sight KCPS (Korean Commander's Panoramic Sight) was developed in 1999 and has a thermal sight for night operation. However, both KGPS and KCPS heavily rely on foreign parts and were reported to have an average localization rate of 27.6% in the year 2004.

Protection 
The SAP was changed to a more protective Korean Special Armor Plate (KSAP) as well as switching American RHA to Korean domestic armor steel. Although the exact specification is classified, it was reported that the KSAP provides a protection level of 600 mm against KE ammunition for frontal armor. In addition, the exterior of the K1A1 has nuts that were not seen on the K1, hinting at a structural difference from the previous version. This is different from the way Americans installed and welded SAP directly to prevent Koreans from technically accessing the armor during the K1 production. Moreover, a captain of the ROK Army Armor School mentioned the combination of explosive reactive armor (ERA) with composite material being used for the armor of K1A1. In 1996, South Korea acquired a 1,250 hp variant of Russian domestic specification T-80Us along with Kontakt-5 ERAs, and T-80Us contributed to developing Korean domestic ERAs and enhancing armor technology. Therefore, based on the available sources, K1A1 is fitted with domestic armor, in which the technology has influence from American M1 Abrams and Russian T-80U, and ERAs are located behind the outer shell of the tank.

Mobility 
Both the torsion bar and hydropneumatic suspension were enhanced to withstand the recoil of the new 120 mm cannon. The vehicle can move at a speed of 60–65 km/h.

Variants and upgrades

ROKIT: Acronym for the Republic of Korea Indigenous Tank. Experimental prototype by Chrysler Defense. 2 vehicles (PV-1 and PV-2) were produced.
XK1: Preproduction prototype by Hyundai Precision Industry. 5 vehicles were produced, and entered service in 1986.
K1: First production variant. 1,027 units built between 1987 and 1997 (445 with GPSS and 582 with GPTTS) in 3 batches. To be upgraded to K1E1 by 2026.
K1M: Proposed export variant for Malaysia.
K1 PIP: Upgraded K1.
K1E1: Further upgraded K1. Production began in December 2013, and the first K1E1 rolled out on 7 July 2014. The upgrade will be similar to that of K1A2. All K1 will be upgraded to K1E1 by 2026. The name was inherited from the K1A1 prototype, the K1E1.
K1E2: As of August 2018, the K1E2 type is planned to be improved. It is expected to be upgraded to a large-scale repair (renovation) in 2024. The main improvement point is the replacement of the new armored upgrading of the protection, installation of the positive pressure device, acceleration of 10% upgrade (1200 hp engine to 1320 hp) or change 1500 hp engine, Introduction of RWS, etc.
K1A1: First major enhanced variant. 484 units built between 1999 and 2010 in 2 batches. To be upgraded to K1A2 by 2023.
K1A2: Upgraded K1A1. Originally named as K1A1 PIP. Developed from 2008 to 2010, and mass-production started in 2012. First upgraded vehicle was rolled out on 20 December 2013. Technology benefit from K2 Black Panther has been applied to this model. It features additional systems such as a digital battlefield control system, IFFS, and front and rear surveillance cameras. With its improved real-time information sharing, inter-combat vehicle operation, friendly fire prevention and driver operability. All K1A1 will be upgraded to K1A2 by 2022.
K1A2 PIP: Upgraded K1A2. Positive pressure devices and air conditioning, soft-kill active protection systems have been added.
K1 ARV: The K1 Armored Recovery Vehicle is based on the K1 tank. It has a crane, winch and dozer system built on the vehicle. It was developed with assistance from Krupp Maschinenbau Kiel GmbH (now Rheinmetall Landsysteme GmbH) between 1988 and 1992, with first deployment in 1993.
K1 AVLB: The K1 Armoured Vehicle-Launched Bridge variant uses a scissor-type bridge system mounted on the chassis. It was developed from 1988 to 1992 with help from Vickers Defense Systems.
K600 CEV: The K1 Combat Engineer Vehicle is based on the K1A1/A2 chassis, mounting a mine plough, an excavator arm on the right side, and a lane marking system.  Development is expected to be completed in June 2018 and begin production in 2019.

Operators 

 Received 1,027 K1 between 1987 to 1997, and 484 K1A1 between 1999 to 2010. All K1/K1A1 are being upgraded to K1E1/K1A2 variants.
 Republic of Korea Army
 Republic of Korea Marine Corps

See also 

 List of main battle tanks by generation
 List of main battle tanks by country

Notes

References

External links

 K1A1 Main Battle Tank Details
K1A1 Tank Overview at Hyundai Rotem Website (Best viewed in Internet Explorer).
 Type 88 K1 Main Battle Tank at GlobalSecurity.org
 K1A1 Main Battle Tank at GlobalSecurity.org
 Photos at GlobalSecurity.org
 K1-K1A1 MBT at Armour.ws

Main battle tanks of the Cold War
Post–Cold War main battle tanks
Main battle tanks of South Korea
Military vehicles introduced in the 1980s